Epse is a village in the municipality of Lochem, province of Gelderland, Netherlands. It lies south of the A1 motorway and north of Gorssel, which was a separate municipality encompassing Epse until 2005, when it was merged with Lochem. In 2021, the village had a population of 2,069. The Dutch Reformed Church at its centre was built in 1930.

History 
It was first mentioned in 1195 as de Epse. The etymology is unclear. In 1840, it was home to 567 people. The Dutch Reformed Church was built in 1930. In 2021, it was announced that the church will close in 2023, and the Catholic church in neighbouring Joppe will also close. In 2000, a northern section of Epse was transferred to Deventer for the construction of an industrial zone. The area was home to 58 people.

References

External links
 
 Epse on plaatsengids.nl

Populated places in Gelderland
Lochem